James S. Matthews was a state legislator in the state of Louisiana. 
Matthews chaired the House Committee on Public Lands. He also chaired a committee investigating "revolutionary" activity in the House in January 1875 following the November 4, 1874 election.

Matthews also served as a justice of the peace and was involved in signing off on a parish ballot box.

References

19th-century American politicians
People from Tensas Parish, Louisiana
American justices of the peace
Year of birth missing
Year of death missing
Place of birth missing
Place of death missing
Republican Party members of the Louisiana House of Representatives